Matty Matheson: Home Style Cookery is a 2020 cookbook by Canadian chef Matty Matheson. It is a follow up to his New York Times Bestseller Matty Matheson: A Cookbook.

Reception
Men's Health named the cookbook one of the Top 10 cookbooks of 2020.

References 

Canadian cookbooks
2020 non-fiction books
Abrams Books books